Falkland Islanders, also called Falklanders and nicknamed Kelpers, are the people of the British Overseas Territory of the Falkland Islands.

Identity 

The Islanders are British, albeit with a distinct identity of their own:

They also see themselves as no different from other immigrant nations, including those of neighbouring South America:

"Kelpers" is a nickname given to Falkland Islanders because the islands are surrounded by large seaweeds called kelp. This term is no longer used as commonly as it once was (largely because it is considered racist and insulting by some islanders when used by Argentines).

Demographic statistics 

The following demographic statistics are from the CIA World Factbook, unless otherwise indicated.

Population

Nationality
With retrospective effect from 1 January 1983, as provided in the British Nationality (Falkland Islands) Act 1983, the Falkland Islanders have been full British citizens.

Ethnic groups

About 70 per cent are of British descent, primarily as a result of Scottish and Welsh immigration to the islands. The native-born inhabitants call themselves "Islanders"; the term "Kelpers", from the kelp which grows profusely around the islands, is still used in the Islands. People from the United Kingdom who have obtained Falkland Island status are known locally as 'belongers'.

A few Islanders are of French, Gibraltarian, Portuguese, and Scandinavian descent. Some are the descendants of whalers who reached the Islands during the last two centuries. There is also a small minority of South American, mainly Chilean origin, and in more recent times many people from Saint Helena have also come to work and live in the Islands.

Religions

The most predominant religion is Christianity, of which the primary denominations are Church of England, Roman Catholic, United Free Church, and Lutheran. Smaller numbers are Jehovah's Witnesses, Seventh-day Adventists, and Greek Orthodox; with the latter being due to Greek fishermen passing through. There is also a congregation of the Baháʼí Faith. The islands are the home of the Apostolic Prefecture of the Falkland Islands.

Languages
The official language of the islands is English. The Falklands English vernacular has a fair amount of borrowed Spanish words (often modified or corrupted); they are particularly numerous, and indeed dominant, in the local horse-related terminology. For instance, the Islanders use 'alizan', 'colorao', 'negro', 'blanco', 'gotiao', 'picasso', 'sarco', 'rabincana' etc. for certain horse colours and looks, or 'bosal', 'cabresta', 'bastos', 'cinch', 'conjinilla', 'meletas', 'tientas', 'manares' etc. for various items of horse gear.

Sport

There are more than 30 different sports clubs on the Falklands, including badminton, clay-pigeon shooting, cricket, football, golf, hockey, netball, rugby union, sailing, swimming, table tennis and volleyball. The Falklands compete in the Commonwealth Games and in the biennial Island Games. Louis Baillon is the only Falkland Islander to have become an Olympic champion, as a member of the British field hockey team which won a gold medal in 1908.

References 

 
Falk